The Time Variance Authority (TVA) is a fictional organization appearing in American comic books published by Marvel Comics. It is depicted as a group of timeline monitors.

In the Marvel Cinematic Universe (MCU), Chronicoms, based on the lower-ranked TVA Chronomonitors, are introduced in the fourth season finale of the ABC series Agents of S.H.I.E.L.D. in 2017, recurring through to its series finale in 2020, while the TVA is featured in the 2021 Disney+ series Loki and the promotional The Simpsons short film The Good, the Bart, and the Loki, primarily embodied by Ravonna Renslayer (portrayed by Gugu Mbatha-Raw) and Mobius M. Mobius (portrayed by Owen Wilson) and controlled by He Who Remains (portrayed by Jonathan Majors) through Miss Minutes (voiced by Tara Strong); a different TVA operating under an unidentified variation of Kang (also Majors) is also introduced in the first season finale.

Publication history
The Time Variance Authority (TVA) first appeared in Thor #372 (October 1986). Created by Walt Simonson and Sal Buscema, the TVA originally paid homage to long-time Marvel writer/editor and continuity expert Mark Gruenwald: the TVA staff were all visually designed as clones of Gruenwald (the classification system for alternate realities—the Marvel multiverse—was devised, in part, by Gruenwald).

Antecedents

Squadron Sinister/Squadron Supreme
Writer Roy Thomas and Sal's brother, artist John Buscema, had previously explored the concept of a Marvel multiverse with Marvel's evil Justice League correlates, called the Squadron Sinister, in Avengers #69 (1969). Thomas later introduced a heroic version of the Squadron Sinister named the Squadron Supreme, which first appeared in Avengers #85–86 (February–March 1971), and which was co-created with John Buscema. 

In 1985–1986, Mark Gruenwald wrote a deconstructionist multiverse storyline featuring the Squadron Supreme in a self-titled twelve-issue limited series.

Captain Britain and the Dimensional Development Court
The concept of a timeline monitoring organization had previously been explored in a Captain Britain story arc originally published in the Marvel UK series The Daredevils #6–8 (1983). Written by Alan Moore and Alan Davis, Captain Britain is brought outside of time to the Supreme Omniversal Tribunal in Eden Place to testify before Lord Mandragon, Majestrix of the Dimensional Development Court, on behalf of the former majestrix, Opal Luna Saturnyne. Saturnyne is accused of failing to protect the multiverse from the creation of a deviant version of Earth-238.  

Prior to Captain Britain's testimony, Mandragon declares that the Earth-238 universe must be "removed" from the multiverse before it destroys the continuums of the other universes.  Saturnyn's legal counsel, a faceless being referred to as Lord Chancellor, objects, as the destruction of the Earth-238 universe will destroy material evidence of Saturnyne's innocence. Lord Mandragon overrules the defense's objection, citing Ominversal Writ clause 723-801-(d). He then proceeds to remove the dangerous deviant timestream using crystal technology.

It is revealed during the trial that the prime Earth that exists in Marvel Comics is Earth-616. (Because of this story, Alan Moore is usually credited with naming the mainstream Marvel Universe "Earth-616." However, Alan Davis has said that it was invented by Dave Thorpe, the previous writer of the UK-published Captain Britain stories.)

TVA as homage to Gruenwald and Captain Britain
While Captain Britain's 1983 story arc does not mention the Time Variance Authority, the Dimensional Development Court contains elements that were plainly retconned by Walt Simonson and Sal Buscema and in subsequent incarnations (such as the TVA employees—chronomonitors—functioning and appearing in new universes in the same manner as the Captain Britain Corps). According to Mark Gruenwald's widow Catherine, Gruenwald's 1985 Squadron Supreme limited series was the work about which he was the proudest.

Fictional background
The TVA claims responsibility for monitoring the multiverse and can prune timelines if they are deemed too dangerous to exist. They also take action to prevent other beings from altering the past or future. They were first seen allowing Justice Peace, a lawman from the future, to travel to the 20th century in order to stop the killer Zaniac. Peace is able to succeed in his mission thanks to the assistance of Thor.

Despite their claims, the TVA's influence over time is not absolute. The scope of their influence is bordered by Alioth in the distant past as well as Kang the Conqueror, the Delubric Consortium, and Revelation at different eras throughout the timescape. There have also been numerous incidents of time travel or reality tampering where the TVA has failed to interfere.

At the End of Time, the last Director of the TVA known as He Who Remains creates the Time-Keepers, the last three beings who exist in the remaining timeline in the universe, who subsequently enslave Immortus. The process also ends up creating the Time Twisters, a trio of beings who imperiled all realities until stopped by Thor and other members of the Avengers.

The TVA are next seen utilizing the law-firm that She-Hulk works for on several instances and laws. Jurors for cases are plucked from time soon before they actually die, minimizing the effects on the time stream. This also establishes the tendencies for time-travelers to go through genetic scrambling, also to minimize the effect on the time-stream. Notably, the scrambling tends to cause similar appearances among various males who undergo the process. A defendant who is found guilty in one of these trials is executed with a weapon called the Retroactive Cannon, or Ret-Can  (a reference to retroactive continuity, or "retcon", a practice used by storytellers to add previously unknown material to an event or remove previously established material from an event in a previous story), which erases the victim, deleting their existence from the universe by undoing their birth and entire history. She-Hulk herself was handed this harsh sentence, but it was overturned as a reward when she helped defeat the villain Clockwise.

Employees
Lower-ranked TVA employees, called Chronomonitors, are literally faceless. They are created artificially, using "quantum technology". The moment a new reality appears, a new faceless agent is created to monitor it, along with the necessary equipment (a personal computer-like device, plus a desk and a chair) to do so. Cloned managers of the Chronomonitors resemble Mark Gruenwald—and, later, Tom DeFalco—both longtime Marvel Comics writers. The most frequent recurring manager is Mobius M. Mobius, a Gruenwald clone.

On occasion, the TVA hires mercenaries for use in the more dangerous missions, such as Justice Peace and Death's Head. These mercenaries often lose limbs which the TVA replaces with clunky robotic parts. Another example of their seemingly anachronistic technology is a time machine shaped like an old locomotive. Professor Justin Alphonse Gamble, a pastiche of the Doctor, is a renegade from the TVA.

Known staff members
 Mr. Alternity – Upper management
 First Secretary
 Professor Justin Alphonse Gamble – A former employee, resigned and stole one of the time capsules
 Justice Mills – A member who appears briefly in a flashback. 
  – The last survivor of the Time Variance Authority who is present at the end of time.
 Mobius M. Mobius – A bureaucrat and middle management, attempted to discipline the Fantastic Four for violations of the TVA's laws
 Mr. Orobouros – A future clone of Mr. Paradox, ceased to exist when Clockwise used the Retro-Active Cannon on Paradox
 Mr. Paradox – He ceased to exist when Clockwise blasted him with the Retro-Active Cannon
 Mr. Tesseract (Junior Management) – A subordinate to Mobius, he was assigned to reconstruct the lost data from Earth-616
 Time Zone Manager
 Time Variance Authority Police Department – A time police group that accompanied Justice Peace in effort to capture Godwulf
 Justice Peace – A former freelance agent. He was punished for infractions of time travel. Currently a member of the Federal Police and Special Services Units that are based in Brooklynopolis
 Justice Might, Justice Truth, and Justice Liberty – Three time police officers who aided Mobius in recapturing the Fantastic Four while they were running loose inside the Null-Time Zone.
 Justice Love – A TVA agent and Justice Peace's partner. She appears to have legal training. 
 Justice Goodwill – A court officer. He ceased to exist when Clockwise blasted him with the Retro-Active Cannon.
  – A group of beings created by He Who Remains to protect time.
  – The armored agents of the TVA who are assigned to guard the TVA's facilities from the Null-Time Zone and extract the disruptive entities that come from the other time periods. Each of its members are either a clone, a cyborg, or a robot.

In other media

Marvel Cinematic Universe

 Chronicoms, based on the lower-ranked TVA chronomonitors, appear in the Marvel Cinematic Universe (MCU) / ABC series Agents of S.H.I.E.L.D.
 The Time Variance Authority (TVA) appears in the MCU / Disney+ series Loki (2021), with Mobius M. Mobius portrayed by Owen Wilson, He Who Remains portrayed by Jonathan Majors (who also provided the uncredited voices of the Time-Keepers), and exclusive members Hunter B-15 portrayed by Wunmi Mosaku, Hunter C-20 portrayed by Sasha Lane, and receptionist Casey portrayed by Eugene Cordero. In addition, Ravonna Renslayer (portrayed by Gugu Mbatha-Raw) serves as a judge within the TVA and the organization has an animated anthropomorphic clock mascot named Miss Minutes (voiced by Tara Strong) who instructs new TVA agents. This version of the organization was created by He Who Remains, who sought to stop evil multiversal variants of himself from coming into being after a "multiversal war" waged between them led to him destroying the multiverse to stop them, by keeping the "Sacred Timeline" in check. In building the TVA, he pulled variants of various people from across time, erased their memories, made them believe they and the TVA were created by the Time-Keepers, and built androids to serve as the Time-Keepers. In the first season finale "For All Time. Always.", He Who Remains is murdered by Sylvie after she rejects his offer to run the TVA with her variant Loki while Mobius and B-15 simultaneously shut down TVA operations after learning they are variants, creating a new multiverse. Loki finds himself in a different TVA run by an unidentified Kang the Conqueror variant (also portrayed by Majors) and encounters different versions of Mobius and B-15.

Film
The Time Variance Authority (TVA), modeled after the MCU version, appears in The Good, the Bart, and the Loki.

See also
 El ministerio del tiempo – a Spanish fantasy television series depicting the eponymous time-protection organization
 Eternity, a time-changing organization featured in the Isaac Asimov novel The End of Eternity
 Exiles (Marvel Comics)
 Linear Men – an organization in the DC Comics universe that performs a similar function to the TVA
 The Commission – a time-protection organization in the The Umbrella Academy
 The Department of Temporal Investigations – an organization similar to the TVA featured in the Star Trek: Deep Space Nine episode "Trials and Tribble-ations"
 Time Lords – a race of time-traveling humanoids central to the Doctor Who universe
 Chronology protection conjecture, an hypothesis in physics

References

External links
 Time Variance Authority at Marvel Appendix

Fictional organizations in Marvel Comics
Comics about time travel
Comics characters introduced in 1986
Comics about multiple time paths
End of the universe in fiction
Thor (Marvel Comics)
Fantastic Four
Characters created by Walt Simonson
Characters created by Sal Buscema